John Jacob McPherson (March 9, 1869 – September 30, 1941) was an American Major League Baseball pitcher. He played for the Philadelphia Athletics during the  season and the Philadelphia Phillies during the  season. He holds the all-time major league record for most career losses by a pitcher (13) whose only major league win was a shutout. McPherson also became the first player to have at least 50 plate appearances (51) in a career without scoring a run.

References

Major League Baseball pitchers
Philadelphia Athletics players
Philadelphia Phillies players
Baseball players from Pennsylvania
1869 births
1941 deaths
New Bedford Whalers (baseball) players
New Bedford Browns players
Marion Glass Blowers players
Milwaukee Creams players
Newark Sailors players
Toronto Maple Leafs (International League) players